Herxheim may refer to:

 Herxheim am Berg, a town in the district Bad Dürkheim, in Rhineland-Palatinate, Germany
 Herxheim (archaeological site), located in the town
 Herxheim (Verbandsgemeinde), an administrative region in Rhineland-Palatinate, Germany
 Herxheim bei Landau/Pfalz, a town in the district Südliche Weinstraße, seat of the administrative region